WKC Stahl- und Metallwarenfabrik ("WKC Steel and Metalwork Factory"), formerly Weyersberg, Kirschbaum & Cie., is a German sword manufacturing company located in Solingen, North Rhine-Westphalia.

The company was founded in 1883 with the merger of two major Solingen sword-making companies, Weyersberg and Kirschbaum. In 1900 the company was the largest in Solingen, employing around 1,200 workers. WKC uses traditional hand forging in their production process. The company supplies over 50 militaries, military academies and police forces worldwide with ceremonial swords. The company also makes Japanese Katanas using the traditional hand forging process.

History 
Weyersberg, Kirschbaum, and Cie. was founded in 1883 with the merger of two family-owned sword manufacturing and marketing companies in Solingen, Germany: Gebruder Weyersberg, founded by Wilhem, Peter and Johann Ludwig Weyersberg in 1787 and WR Kirschbaum & Cie, founded by Wilhem Reinhordt Kirschbaum. The newly founded company used traditional techniques for sword making and each of their then employees specialised in one task in the sword making process. This was in accordance to the Division of Labor act devised by the Sword makers Guild of Soligen.

Prior to the merger Fritz Weyersberg had purchased the patent for a blade roll forge invented in England. This machine allowed the sword manufacturing plant to significantly increase blade production. By 1900 WKC's production was such that it employed around 1,200 workers and was the largest company in Solingen. At this time the company not only produced swords but weapons, motorcycles and bike parts as well.

In the year 1922, WKC was bought by the company "Siegen Solinger Gussstahlverein" who was a previous supplier of theirs. The company continued to flourish until the Great Depression. During this time like most companies in Germany, WKC suffered greatly and worsened as during World War II, the company was a target of Allied bombardment. These bombings resulted in almost all of the buildings and equipment owned by the company at the time being destroyed and so all operations there ceased.

In 1955 the company again changed hands with Hans Kolping, a Solingen knife producer, buying the company. He restarted the company and produced swords, knives and pistols. Soon after he discontinued the production of pistols and concentrated on ceremonial sword production and so the company established its own blade etching plant. The company's first orders at this time came from the United States Navy and the United States Marine Corps.

On 1989 Hans Kolping died and left the company to his life partner, Margard Willms. Soon after the company changed ownership and Joachim Willms undertook large investments in the buildings and the equipment so as to further grow the company. In 1995, André Willms, the current owner, joined the company.

In November 2005 the Wilkinson Sword factory of London closed. In order to facilitate production of British ceremonial swords Wilkinson held a sealed bid for its assets. WKC participated and acquired the majority of Wilkinson's tools, spare parts and their roll forge. These items were transported to Germany and implemented in WKC's production process. This allowed the company to produce a greater number of sword types and to supply more countries.

WKC won the contract to produce the Model 2011 Swords for West Point Cadets at the United States Military Academy.

Management 
In 2001 André Willms took over majority ownership of WKC from his father Ernst Joachim Willms. He is the current Managing Director of the company.

See also
 West Point Cadets' Sword

External links
 

Companies based in Solingen
Knife manufacturing companies
Manufacturing companies of Germany
Manufacturing companies established in 1883